Lampeidae is a family of ctenophores belonging to the order Cydippida.

Genera:
 Gastropodes
 Lampea Stechow, 1921 
 Lampetia Chun, 1880

References

Tentaculata
Animal families